Sean Peter Daniel (born August 15, 1951) is an American film producer and movie executive.

Life and career
Born to a Jewish family, Daniel attended Manhattan's High School of Music & Art, graduating in 1969. He received a Bachelor of Fine Arts in film from the California Institute of the Arts in 1973.

In 1976, he joined Universal Pictures as a film production executive and in 1985, at the age of 34, he became production president, the youngest in the studio's history, a position he held for five years. At Universal he supervised the financing and production of such acclaimed films as National Lampoon's Animal House, Coal Miner's Daughter, The Blues Brothers, The Breakfast Club, Sixteen Candles, Fast Times at Ridgemont High, Brazil, Field of Dreams, Do the Right Thing, Back to the Future, Out of Africa, Midnight Run, Born on the Fourth of July, Missing, Weird Science, Uncle Buck, The Great Outdoors, Born in East L.A., Fletch, Gorillas in the Mist, Darkman, and Monty Python's The Meaning of Life.

Following his tenure as an executive at the studio, Daniel started Alphaville Films with James Jacks. The production company was formed around the development and production of the first Mummy film that, based on its success, created a franchise yielding The Mummy Returns, The Mummy: Tomb of the Dragon Emperor, and The Scorpion King. Through their company, Daniel and Jacks also produced such films as Richard Linklater’s Dazed and Confused, the renowned western Tombstone; Nora Ephron’s comedy Michael, which starred John Travolta; Sam Raimi’s A Simple Plan; the Coen Brothers’ Intolerable Cruelty; the Chris Rock/Weitz Brothers comedy Down to Earth; the rap-music comedy CB4, also with Chris Rock; Jerry Zucker’s Rat Race; John Woo’s first American film, Hard Target; The Jackal, which starred Richard Gere and Bruce Willis; Sam Raimi's The Gift starring Cate Blanchett; and American Me which starred and was directed by Edward James Olmos.

Daniel's 2016 films are Richard Linklater's Everybody Wants Some!!, and Ben-Hur, an adaptation that returns to the original novel, with Timur Bekmambetov directing a script by Academy Award-winner John Ridley.

Daniel is currently the principal in The Sean Daniel Company, an independent production company that is developing projects at several studios and networks. At Universal, Daniel partnered with the producing team of Alex Kurtzman and Chris Morgan to create a new series of re-imagined Mummy movies, starting with 2017's The Mummy. In development is the follow up to Universal's The Best Man Holiday which Daniel produced alongside writer/director/producer Malcolm D. Lee.

Daniel is the Executive Producer of the TV series The Expanse, for SyFy and Alcon Television Group. Based on the New York Times Best-Selling franchise by James S. A. Corey and adapted to screen by Academy Award-nominated screenwriters Mark Fergus and Hawk Ostby (Children of Men, Iron Man), the sci-fi thriller series is among the cable networks most ambitious project to date. The Expanse first aired December 2015 and stars Thomas Jane, Steven Strait, and Shohreh Aghdashloo.  In addition to The Expanse, The Sean Daniel Company's television credits include Graceland, from Jeff Eastin, the creator of White Collar, now in its third season on the USA Network. The Sean Daniel Company has also just partnered with Google to develop a TV drama based on Ingress, a game with millions of participants, that uses real locations and social media activity. Additionally, Daniel has executive produced the TNT original film Freedom Song, directed by Phil Alden Robinson and which starred Danny Glover; HBO's Everyday People; and the USA Network’s four-hour mini series Attila, starring Gerard Butler. 
 
Among the company's other projects is a partnership with independently funded Valiant Entertainment to make films based on their comic book characters, and Agent 13, based on the novel series, with Charlize Theron starring and producing with The Sean Daniel Company and Rupert Wyatt directing.
  
Daniel has been a participant in the debate about media and culture, appearing on TV’s The McLaughlin Group and NPR’s Which Way L.A., and in The New York Times, Los Angeles Times, and The Huffington Post.

Personal life
Daniel is married to Ruth Hunter, a staffer for the NRDC.

Selected filmography 
He was a producer in all films unless otherwise noted.

Film

Production manager

As an actor

Thanks

Television

References

External links

1951 births
Film producers from New York (state)
NBCUniversal people
20th-century American Jews
Living people
The High School of Music & Art alumni
21st-century American Jews